Mordellistena lichtneckerti is a beetle in the genus Mordellistena of the family Mordellidae. It was described in 1977 by Ermisch  and can be found in Austria, Hungary, Romania and Slovakia.

References

lichtneckerti
Beetles described in 1977
Beetles of Europe